Hemiphrynus is a genus of flea beetles in the family Chrysomelidae. There are 8 described species from the Nearctic and Neotropics.

Selected species
 Hemiphrynus elongatus (Jacoby, 1884)
 Hemiphrynus intermedius (Jacoby, 1884)
 Hemiphrynus sulcatipennis Jacoby, 1891
 Hemiphrynus tenuicornis Jacoby, 1891

References

Alticini
Chrysomelidae genera
Articles created by Qbugbot
Taxa named by George Henry Horn